Kameshkirsky District is an administrative and municipal district (raion), one of the twenty-seven in Penza Oblast, Russia. It is located in the southeast of the oblast. Its administrative center is the rural locality (a selo) of Russky Kameshkir. Population: 12,802 (2010 Census);  The population of Russky Kameshkir accounts for 41.9% of the district's total population.

References

Notes

Sources

Districts of Penza Oblast